The 1948 (or First) Arab–Israeli War was the second and final stage of the 1948 Palestine war. It formally began following the end of the British Mandate for Palestine at midnight on 14 May 1948; the Israeli Declaration of Independence had been issued earlier that day, and a military coalition of Arab states entered the territory of British Palestine in the morning of 15 May.

The day after the 29 November 1947 adoption of the United Nations Partition Plan for Palestine – which planned to divide Palestine into an Arab state, a Jewish state, and the Special International Regime encompassing the cities of Jerusalem and Bethlehem – seven Jews were killed in the Fajja bus attacks by Arab militants in an incident regarded as the first in the civil war. This attack was retaliation to the assassination of five members of an Arab family, suspected of being British informants, by Lehi on 19 November. There had been tension and conflict between Arabs, Jews, and the British since the 1917 Balfour Declaration and the 1920 creation of the British Mandate of Palestine. British policies dissatisfied both Arabs and Jews. Arab opposition developed into the 1936–1939 Arab revolt in Palestine, while the Jewish opposition developed into the 1944–1947 Jewish insurgency in Palestine.

On 15 May 1948, the civil war transformed into a conflict between Israel and the Arab states following the Israeli Declaration of Independence the previous day. Egypt, Transjordan, Syria, and expeditionary forces from Iraq entered Palestine. The invading forces took control of the Arab areas and immediately attacked Israeli forces and several Jewish settlements. The 10 months of fighting took place mostly on the territory of the British Mandate and in the Sinai Peninsula and southern Lebanon, interrupted by several truce periods.

As a result of the war, the State of Israel controlled the area that the UN had proposed for the Jewish state, as well as almost 60% of the area proposed for the Arab state, including the Jaffa, Lydda and Ramle area, Upper Galilee, some parts of the Negev and a wide strip along the Tel Aviv–Jerusalem road. Israel also took control of West Jerusalem, which was meant to be part of an international zone for Jerusalem and its environs. Transjordan took control of East Jerusalem and what became known as the West Bank, annexing it the following year, and the Egyptian military took control of the Gaza Strip. At the Jericho Conference on 1 December 1948, 2,000 Palestinian delegates called for unification of Palestine and Transjordan as a step toward full Arab unity. The conflict triggered significant demographic change throughout the Middle East. Around 700,000 Palestinian Arabs fled or were expelled from their homes in the area that became Israel, and they became Palestinian refugees in what they refer to as the Nakba ("the catastrophe"). A similar number of Jews moved to Israel during the three years following the war, including 260,000 from the surrounding Arab states.

Background

On 29 November 1947, the United Nations General Assembly adopted a resolution recommending the adoption and implementation of a plan to partition the British Mandate of Palestine into two states, one Arab and one Jewish, and the City of Jerusalem.

The General Assembly resolution on Partition was greeted with overwhelming joy in Jewish communities and widespread outrage in the Arab world. In Palestine, violence erupted almost immediately, feeding into a spiral of reprisals and counter-reprisals. The British refrained from intervening as tensions boiled over into a low-level conflict that quickly escalated into a full-scale civil war.

From January onwards, operations became increasingly militarised, with the intervention of a number of Arab Liberation Army regiments inside Palestine, each active in a variety of distinct sectors around the different coastal towns. They consolidated their presence in Galilee and Samaria. Abd al-Qadir al-Husayni came from Egypt with several hundred men of the Army of the Holy War. Having recruited a few thousand volunteers, al-Husayni organised the blockade of the 100,000 Jewish residents of Jerusalem. To counter this, the Yishuv authorities tried to supply the city with convoys of up to 100 armoured vehicles, but the operation became more and more impractical as the number of casualties in the relief convoys surged. By March, Al-Hussayni's tactic had paid off. Almost all of Haganah's armoured vehicles had been destroyed, the blockade was in full operation, and hundreds of Haganah members who had tried to bring supplies into the city were killed. The situation for those who dwelt in the Jewish settlements in the highly isolated Negev and north of Galilee was even more critical.

While the Jewish population had received strict orders requiring them to hold their ground everywhere at all costs, the Arab population was more affected by the general conditions of insecurity to which the country was exposed. Up to 100,000 Arabs, from the urban upper and middle classes in Haifa, Jaffa and Jerusalem, or Jewish-dominated areas, evacuated abroad or to Arab centres eastwards.

This situation caused the United States to withdraw its support for the Partition Plan, thus encouraging the Arab League to believe that the Palestinian Arabs, reinforced by the Arab Liberation Army, could put an end to the plan. The British, on the other hand, decided on 7 February 1948 to support the annexation of the Arab part of Palestine by Transjordan.

Although a certain level of doubt took hold among Yishuv supporters, their apparent defeats were due more to their wait-and-see policy than to weakness. David Ben-Gurion reorganised Haganah and made conscription obligatory. Every Jewish man and woman in the country had to receive military training. Thanks to funds raised by Golda Meir from sympathisers in the United States, and Stalin's decision to support the Zionist cause, the Jewish representatives of Palestine were able to sign very important armament contracts in the East. Other Haganah agents recuperated stockpiles from the Second World War, which helped improve the army's equipment and logistics. Operation Balak allowed arms and other equipment to be transported for the first time by the end of March.

Ben-Gurion invested Yigael Yadin with the responsibility to come up with a plan of offence whose timing was related to the foreseeable evacuation of British forces. This strategy, called Plan Dalet, was readied by March and implemented towards the end of April. A separate plan, Operation Nachshon, was devised to lift the siege of Jerusalem. 1500 men from Haganah's Givati brigade and Palmach's Harel brigade conducted sorties to free up the route to the city between 5 and 20 April. Both sides acted offensively in defiance of the Partition Plan, which foresaw Jerusalem as a corpus separatum, under neither Jewish nor Arab jurisdiction. The Arabs did not accept the Plan, while the Jews were determined to oppose the internationalisation of the city, and secure it as part of the Jewish state. The operation was successful, and enough foodstuffs to last two months were trucked into Jerusalem for distribution to the Jewish population. The success of the operation was assisted by the death of al-Husayni in combat. During this time, and independently of Haganah or the framework of Plan Dalet, irregular fighters from Irgun and Lehi formations massacred a substantial number of Arabs at Deir Yassin, an event that, though publicly deplored and criticised by the principal Jewish authorities, had a deep impact on the morale of the Arab population and contributed to generate the exodus of the Arab population.

At the same time, the Arab Liberation Army was roundly defeated at Mishmar HaEmek in its first large-scale operation, coinciding with the loss of their Druze allies through defection.

Within the framework of the establishment of Jewish territorial continuity foreseen by Plan Dalet, the Haganah, Palmach and Irgun forces intended to conquer mixed zones. The Palestinian Arab society was shaken. Tiberias, Haifa, Safed, Beisan, Jaffa and Acre fell, resulting in the flight of more than 250,000 Palestinian Arabs.

The British had, at that time, essentially withdrawn their troops. The situation pushed the leaders of the neighbouring Arab states to intervene, but their preparation was not finalised, and they could not assemble sufficient forces to turn the tide of the war. The majority of Palestinian Arab hopes lay with the Arab Legion of Transjordan's monarch, King Abdullah I, but he had no intention of creating a Palestinian Arab-run state, since he hoped to annex as much of the territory of the British Mandate for Palestine as he could. He was playing a double game, being just as much in contact with the Jewish authorities as with the Arab League.

In preparation for the offensive, Haganah successfully launched Operations Yiftah and Ben-'Ami to secure the Jewish settlements of Galilee, and Operation Kilshon, which created a united front around Jerusalem. The inconclusive meeting between Golda Meir and Abdullah I, followed by the Kfar Etzion massacre on 13 May by the Arab Legion led to predictions that the battle for Jerusalem would be merciless.

On 14 May 1948, David Ben-Gurion declared the establishment of the State of Israel and the 1948 Palestine war entered its second phase with the intervention of the Arab state armies and the beginning of the 1948 Arab–Israeli War.

Armed forces
By September 1947, the Haganah had "10,489 rifles, 702 light machine-guns, 2,666 submachine guns, 186 medium machine-guns, 672 two-inch mortars and 92 three-inch (76 mm) mortars".

Importing arms
In 1946, Ben-Gurion decided that the Yishuv would probably have to defend itself against both the Palestinian Arabs and neighbouring Arab states and accordingly began a "massive, covert arms acquisition campaign in the West", and acquired many more during the first few months of hostilities. 

The Yishuv managed to clandestinely amass arms and military equipment abroad for transfer to Palestine once the British blockade was lifted. In the United States, Yishuv agents purchased three Boeing B-17 Flying Fortress bombers, one of which bombed Cairo in July 1948, some Curtiss C-46 Commando transport planes, and dozens of half-tracks, which were repainted and defined as "agricultural equipment". In Western Europe, Haganah agents amassed fifty 65mm French mountain guns, twelve 120mm mortars, ten H-35 light tanks, and a large number of half-tracks. By mid-May or thereabouts the Yishuv had purchased from Czechoslovakia 25 Avia S-199 fighters (an inferior version of the Messerschmitt Bf 109), 200 heavy machine guns, 5,021 light machine guns, 24,500 rifles, and 52 million rounds of ammunition, enough to equip all units, but short of heavy arms. The airborne arms smuggling missions from Czechoslovakia were codenamed Operation Balak.

The airborne smuggling missions were carried out by mostly American aviators – Jews and non-Jews – led by ex-U.S. Air Transport Command flight engineer Al Schwimmer. Schwimmer's operation also included recruiting and training fighter pilots such as Lou Lenart, commander of the first Israeli air assault against the Arabs.

Arms production
The Yishuv also had "a relatively advanced arms producing capacity", that between October 1947 and July 1948" produced 3 million 9 mm bullets, 150,000 Mills grenades, 16,000 submachine guns (Sten Guns) and 210 three-inch (76 mm) mortars", along with a few "Davidka" mortars, which had been indigenously designed and produced. They were inaccurate but had a spectacularly loud explosion that demoralised the enemy. A large amount of the munitions used by the Israelis came from the Ayalon Institute, a clandestine bullet factory underneath kibbutz Ayalon, which produced about 2.5 million bullets for Sten guns. The munitions produced by the Ayalon Institute were said to have been the only supply that was not in shortage during the war. Locally produced explosives were also plentiful. After Israel's independence, these clandestine arms manufacturing operations no longer had to be concealed, and were moved above ground. All of the Haganah's weapons-manufacturing was centralised and later became Israel Military Industries.

Manpower
In November 1947, the Haganah was an underground paramilitary force that had existed as a highly organised, national force, since the Arab riots of 1920–21, and throughout the riots of 1929, Great Uprising of 1936–39, and World War II. It had a mobile force, the HISH, which had 2,000 full-time fighters (men and women) and 10,000 reservists (all aged between 18 and 25) and an elite unit, the Palmach composed of 2,100 fighters and 1,000 reservists. The reservists trained three or four days a month and went back to civilian life the rest of the time. These mobile forces could rely on a garrison force, the HIM (Heil Mishmar, lit. Guard Corps), composed of people aged over 25. The Yishuv's total strength was around 35,000 with 15,000 to 18,000 fighters and a garrison force of roughly 20,000.

There were also several thousand men and women who had served in the British Army in World War II who did not serve in any of the underground militias but would provide valuable military experience during the war. Walid Khalidi says the Yishuv had the additional forces of the Jewish Settlement Police, numbering some 12,000, the Gadna Youth Battalions, and the armed settlers. Few of the units had been trained by December 1947. On 5 December 1947, conscription was instituted for all men and women aged between 17 and 25 and by the end of March, 21,000 had been conscripted. On 30 March, the call-up was extended to men and single women aged between 26 and 35. Five days later, a General Mobilization order was issued for all men under 40.

Irgun
The Irgun, whose activities were considered by MI5 to be terrorism, was monitored by the British.

By March 1948, the Yishuv had a numerical superiority, with 35,780 mobilised and deployed fighters for the Haganah, 3,000 of Stern and Irgun, and a few thousand armed settlers.

Arab forces
According to Benny Morris, by the end of 1947, the Palestinians already "had a healthy and demoralising respect for the Yishuv's military power" and if it came to battle, the Palestinians expected to lose. When the first violent incidents broke out in Jerusalem on the 29 November, the Arab Higher Committee, well aware of  their lack of armaments, had called for a three day strike: the most militant Palestinian group in the city, consisting of 44 fighters, was furnished with 12 rifles, some handguns and a few kilograms of explosives. 

The effective number of Arab combatants is listed as growing to 12,000 by some historians while others calculate an eventual total Arab strength of approximately 23,500 troops, and with this being more of less or roughly equal to that of the Yishuv.  However, as Israel mobilised most of its most able citizens during the war while the Arab troops were only a small percentage of its far greater population, the strength of the Yishuv grew steadily and dramatically during the war.

Political objectives

Yishuv
Yishuv's aims evolved during the war. Mobilization for a total war was organised. Initially, the aim was "simple and modest": to survive the assaults of the Palestinian Arabs and the Arab states. "The Zionist leaders deeply, genuinely, feared a Middle Eastern reenactment of the Holocaust, which had just ended; the Arabs' public rhetoric reinforced these fears". As the war progressed, the aim of expanding the Jewish state beyond the UN partition borders appeared: first to incorporate clusters of isolated Jewish settlements and later to add more territories to the state and give it defensible borders. A third and further aim that emerged among the political and military leaders after four or five months was to "reduce the size of Israel's prospective large and hostile Arab minority, seen as a potential powerful fifth column, by belligerency and expulsion". Shay Hazkani's research concludes that Ben-Gurion and segments of the religious Zionist leadership drew parallels between the war and the biblical wars of extermination, and states this was not a fringe position. IDF indoctrination pamphlets were distributed to recruits  instructing them that God “demands a revenge of extermination without mercy to whoever tries to hurt us for no reason.”.

Plan Dalet, or Plan D, (Tokhnit dalet) was a plan worked out by the Haganah, a Jewish paramilitary group and the forerunner of the Israel Defense Forces, in autumn 1947 to spring 1948, which was sent to Haganah units in early March 1948. The intent of Plan Dalet is subject to much controversy, with historians on the one extreme asserting that it was entirely defensive, and historians on the other extreme asserting that the plan aimed at maximum conquest and expulsion of the Palestinians. According to Ilan Pappé, its purpose was to conquer as much of Palestine and to expel as many Palestinians as possible, though according to Benny Morris there was no such intent. In his book The Ethnic Cleansing of Palestine, Pappé asserts that Plan Dalet was a "blueprint for ethnic cleansing" with the aim of reducing both rural and urban areas of Palestine. According to Gelber, the plan specified that in case of resistance, the population of conquered villages was to be expelled outside the borders of the Jewish state. If no resistance was met, the residents could stay put, under military rule. According to Morris, Plan D called for occupying the areas within the U.N. sponsored Jewish state, several concentrations of Jewish population outside those areas (West Jerusalem and Western Galilee), and areas along the roads where the invading Arab armies were expected to attack.

The Yishuv perceived the peril of an Arab invasion as threatening its very existence. Having no real knowledge of the Arabs' true military capabilities, the Jews took Arab propaganda literally, preparing for the worst and reacting accordingly.

Arab League as a whole
The Arab League had unanimously rejected the UN partition plan and were bitterly opposed to the establishment of a Jewish state alongside an Arab one.

The Arab League before partition affirmed the right to the independence of Palestine, while blocking the creation of a Palestinian government. Towards the end of 1947, the League established a military committee commanded by the retired Iraqi general Isma'il Safwat whose mission was to analyse the chance of victory of the Palestinians against the Jews. His conclusions were that they had no chance of victory and that an invasion of the Arab regular armies was mandatory. The political committee nevertheless rejected these conclusions and decided to support an armed opposition to the Partition Plan excluding the participation of their regular armed forces.

In April with the Palestinian defeat, the refugees coming from Palestine and the pressure of their public opinion, the Arab leaders decided to invade Palestine.

The Arab League gave reasons for its invasion in Palestine in the cablegram:
 the Arab states find themselves compelled to intervene in order to restore law and order and to check further bloodshed.
 the Mandate over Palestine has come to an end, leaving no legally constituted authority.
 the only solution of the Palestine problem is the establishment of a unitary Palestinian state.

British diplomat Alec Kirkbride wrote in his 1976 memoirs about a conversation with the Arab League's Secretary-General Azzam Pasha a week before the armies marched: "...when I asked him for his estimate of the size of the Jewish forces, [he] waved his hands and said: 'It does not matter how many there are. We will sweep them into the sea.'" Approximately six months previously, according to an interview in an 11 October 1947 article of Akhbar al-Yom, Azzam said: "I personally wish that the Jews do not drive us to this war, as this will be a war of extermination and a momentous massacre which will be spoken of like the Mongolian massacres and the Crusades".

According to Yoav Gelber, the Arab countries were "drawn into the war by the collapse of the Palestinian Arabs and the Arab Liberation Army [and] the Arab governments' primary goal was preventing the Palestinian Arabs' total ruin and the flooding of their own countries by more refugees. According to their own perception, had the invasion not taken place, there was no Arab force in Palestine capable of checking the Haganah's offensive".

King Abdullah I of Transjordan
King Abdullah was the commander of the Arab Legion, the strongest Arab army involved in the war according to Rogan and Shlaim in 2007. However, Morris wrote in 2008 that the Egyptian army was the most powerful and threatening army. The Arab Legion had about 10,000 soldiers, trained and commanded by British officers.

In 1946–47, Abdullah said that he had no intention to "resist or impede the partition of Palestine and creation of a Jewish state." Ideally, Abdullah would have liked to annexe all of Palestine, but he was prepared to compromise. He supported the partition, intending that the West Bank area of the British Mandate allocated for the Arab state be annexed to Jordan. Abdullah had secret meetings with the Jewish Agency (at which the future Israeli Prime Minister Golda Meir was among the delegates) that reached an agreement of Jewish non-interference with Jordanian annexation of the West Bank (although Abdullah failed in his goal of acquiring an outlet to the Mediterranean Sea through the Negev desert) and of Jordanian agreement not to attack the area of the Jewish state contained in the United Nations partition resolution (in which Jerusalem was given neither to the Arab nor the Jewish state, but was to be an internationally administered area). In order to keep their support to his plan of annexation of the Arab State, Abdullah promised to the British he would not attack the Jewish State.

The neighbouring Arab states pressured Abdullah into joining them in an "all-Arab military invasion" against the newly created State of Israel, that he used to restore his prestige in the Arab world, which had grown suspicious of his relatively good relationship with Western and Jewish leaders. Jordan's undertakings not to cross partition lines were not taken at face value. While repeating assurances that Jordan would only take areas allocated to a future Arab state, on the eve of war Tawfik Abu al-Huda told the British that were other Arab armies to advance against Israel, Jordan would follow suit. On 23 May Abdullah told the French consul in Amman that he "was determined to fight Zionism and prevent the establishment of an Israeli state on the border of his kingdom".

Abdullah's role in this war became substantial. He saw himself as the "supreme commander of the Arab forces" and "persuaded the Arab League to appoint him" to this position. Through his leadership, the Arabs fought the 1948 war to meet Abdullah's political goals.

Other Arab states
King Farouk of Egypt was anxious to prevent Abdullah from being seen as the main champion of the Arab world in Palestine, which he feared might damage his own leadership aspirations of the Arab world. In addition, Farouk wished to annexe all of southern Palestine to Egypt. According to Gamal Abdel Nasser the Egyptian army first communique described the Palestine operations as a merely punitive expedition against the Zionist "gangs", using a term frequent in Haganah reports of Palestinian fighters. According to a 2019 study, "senior British intelligence, military officers and diplomats in Cairo were deeply involved in a covert scheme to drive the King to participate in the Arab states' war coalition against Israel." These intelligence officers acted without the approval or knowledge of the British government.

Nuri as-Said, the strongman of Iraq, had ambitions for bringing the entire Fertile Crescent under Iraqi leadership. Both Syria and Lebanon wished to take certain areas of northern Palestine.

One result of the ambitions of the various Arab leaders was a distrust of all the Palestinian leaders who wished to set up a Palestinian state, and a mutual distrust of each other. Co-operation was to be very poor during the war between the various Palestinian factions and the Arab armies.

Arab Higher Committee of Amin al-Husayni

Following rumours that King Abdullah was re-opening the bilateral negotiations with Israel that he had previously conducted in secret with the Jewish Agency, the Arab League, led by Egypt, decided to set up the All-Palestine Government in Gaza on 8 September under the nominal leadership of the Mufti. Abdullah regarded the attempt to revive al-Husayni's Holy War Army as a challenge to his authority and all armed bodies operating in the areas controlled by the Arab Legion were disbanded. Glubb Pasha carried out the order ruthlessly and efficiently.

Initial line-up of forces

Military assessments
Though the State of Israel faced the formidable armies of neighbouring Arab countries, yet due to previous battles by the middle of May the Palestinians themselves hardly existed as a military force. The British Intelligence and Arab League military reached similar conclusions.

The British Foreign Ministry and the CIA believed that the Arab states would finally win in case of war. Martin Van Creveld says that in terms of manpower, the sides were fairly evenly matched.

In May, Egyptian generals told their government that the invasion would be "A parade without any risks" and Tel Aviv would be taken "in two weeks." Egypt, Iraq, and Syria all possessed air forces, Egypt and Syria had tanks, and all had some modern artillery. Initially, the Haganah had no heavy machine guns, artillery, armoured vehicles, anti-tank or anti-aircraft weapons, nor military aircraft or tanks. The four Arab armies that invaded on 15 May were far stronger than the Haganah formations they initially encountered.

On 12 May, three days before the invasion, David Ben-Gurion was told by his chief military advisers (who over-estimated the size of the Arab armies and the numbers and efficiency of the troops who would be committed – much as the Arab generals tended to exaggerate Jewish fighters' strength) that Israel's chances of winning a war against the Arab states were only about even.

Yishuv/Israeli forces
Jewish forces at the invasion: Sources disagree about the amount of arms at the Yishuv's disposal at the end of the Mandate. According to Karsh before the arrival of arms shipments from Czechoslovakia as part of Operation Balak, there was roughly one weapon for every three fighters, and even the Palmach could arm only two out of every three of its active members. According to Collins and LaPierre, by April 1948, the Haganah had managed to accumulate only about 20,000 rifles and Sten guns for the 35,000 soldiers who existed on paper. According to Walid Khalidi "the arms at the disposal of these forces were plentiful". France authorised Air France to transport cargo to Tel Aviv on 13 May.

Yishuv forces were organised in 9 brigades, and their numbers grew following Israeli independence, eventually expanding to 12 brigades. Although both sides increased their manpower over the first few months of the war, the Israeli forces grew steadily as a result of the progressive mobilisation of Israeli society and the influx of an average of 10,300 immigrants each month. By the end of 1948, the Israel Defense Forces had 88,033 soldiers, including 60,000 combat soldiers.

After the invasion: France allowed aircraft carrying arms from Czechoslovakia to land on French territory in transit to Israel, and permitted two arms shipments to ‘Nicaragua’, which were actually intended for Israel.

Czechoslovakia supplied vast quantities of arms to Israel during the war, including thousands of vz. 24 rifles and MG 34 and ZB 37 machine guns, and millions of rounds of ammunition. Czechoslovakia supplied fighter aircraft, including at first ten Avia S-199 fighter planes.

The Haganah readied twelve cargo ships throughout European ports to transfer the accumulated equipment, which would set sail as soon as the British blockade was lifted with the expiration of the Mandate.

Following Israeli independence, the Israelis managed to build three Sherman tanks from scrap-heap material found in abandoned British ordnance depots.

The Haganah also managed to obtain stocks of British weapons due to the logistical complexity of the British withdrawal, and the corruption of a number of officials.

After the first truce: By July 1948, the Israelis had established an air force, a navy, and a tank battalion.

On 29 June 1948, the day before the last British troops left Haifa, two British soldiers sympathetic to the Israelis stole two Cromwell tanks from an arms depot in the Haifa port area, smashing them through the unguarded gates, and joined the IDF with the tanks. These two tanks would form the basis of the Israeli Armored Corps.

After the second truce: Czechoslovakia supplied Supermarine Spitfire fighter planes, which were smuggled to Israel via an abandoned Luftwaffe runway in Yugoslavia, with the agreement of the Yugoslav government. The airborne arms smuggling missions from Czechoslovakia were codenamed Operation Balak.

Arab forces
At the invasion: In addition to the local irregular Palestinian militia groups, the five Arab states that joined the war were Egypt, Transjordan, Syria, Lebanon and Iraq sending expeditionary forces of their regular armies. Additional contingents came from Saudi Arabia and Yemen. On the eve of the war, the available number of Arab troops likely to be committed to war was between 23,500 and 26,500 (10,000 Egyptians, 4,500 Jordanians, 3,000 Iraqis, 3,000–6,000 Syrians, 2,000 ALA volunteers, 1,000 Lebanese, and several hundred Saudis), in addition to the irregular Palestinians already present. Prior to the war, Arab forces had been trained by British and French instructors. This was particularly true of Jordan's Arab Legion under command of Lt Gen Sir John Glubb.

Syria bought a quantity of small arms for the Arab Liberation Army from Czechoslovakia, but the shipment never arrived due to Haganah force intervention.

Arab states
Jordan's Arab Legion was considered the most effective Arab force. Armed, trained and commanded by British officers, this 8,000–12,000 strong force was organised in four infantry/mechanised regiments supported by some 40 artillery pieces and 75 armoured cars. Until January 1948, it was reinforced by the 3,000-strong Transjordan Frontier Force. As many as 48 British officers served in the Arab Legion. Glubb Pasha, the commander of the Legion, organised his forces into four brigades as follows:

The Arab Legion joined the war in May 1948, but fought only in the area that King Abdullah wanted to secure for Jordan: the West Bank, including East Jerusalem.

France prevented a large sale of arms by a Swiss company to Ethiopia, brokered by the U.K foreign office, which was actually destined for Egypt and Jordan, denied a British request at the end of April to permit the landing of a squadron of British aircraft on their way to Transjordan, and applied diplomatic pressure on Belgium to suspend arms sales to the Arab states.

The Jordanian forces were probably the best trained of all combatants. Other combatant forces lacked the ability to make strategic decisions and tactical manoeuvres, as evidenced by positioning the fourth regiment at Latrun, which was abandoned by ALA combatants before the arrival of the Jordanian forces and the importance of which was not fully understood by the Haganah general-staff. In the later stages of the war, Latrun proved to be of extreme importance, and a decisive factor in Jerusalem's fate.

In 1948, Iraq's army had 21,000 men in 12 brigades and the Iraqi Air Force had 100 planes, mostly British. Initially the Iraqis committed around 3,000 men to the war effort, including four infantry brigades, one armoured battalion and support personnel. These forces were to operate under Jordanian guidance The first Iraqi forces to be deployed reached Jordan in April 1948 under the command of Gen. Nur ad-Din Mahmud.

In 1948, Egypt's army was able to put a maximum of around 40,000 men into the field, 80% of its military-age male population being unfit for military service and its embryonic logistics system being limited in its ability to support ground forces deployed beyond its borders. Initially, an expeditionary force of 10,000 men was sent to Palestine under the command of Maj. Gen. Ahmed Ali al-Mwawi. This force consisted of five infantry battalions, one armoured battalion equipped with British Light Tank Mk VI and Matilda tanks, one battalion of sixteen 25-pounder guns, a battalion of eight 6-pounder guns and one medium-machine-gun battalion with supporting troops.

The Egyptian Air Force had over 30 Spitfires, 4 Hawker Hurricanes and 20 C47s modified into crude bombers.

Syria had 12,000 soldiers at the beginning of the 1948 War, grouped into three infantry brigades and an armoured force of approximately battalion size. The Syrian Air Force had fifty planes, the 10 newest of which were World War II–generation models.

France suspended arms sales to Syria, notwithstanding signed contracts.

Lebanon's army was the smallest of the Arab armies, consisting of only 3,500 soldiers. According to Gelber, in June 1947, Ben-Gurion "arrived at an agreement with the Maronite religious leadership in Lebanon that cost a few thousand pounds and kept Lebanon's army out of the War of Independence and the military Arab coalition." A token force of 436 soldiers crossed into northern Galilee, seized two villages after a small skirmish, and withdrew. Israel then invaded and occupied southern Lebanon until the end of the war.

Arab forces after the first truce: By the time of the second truce, the Egyptians had 20,000 men in the field in thirteen battalions equipped with 135 tanks and 90 artillery pieces.

During the first truce, the Iraqis increased their force to about 10,000. Ultimately, the Iraqi expeditionary force numbered around 18,000 men.

Saudi Arabia sent hundreds of volunteers to join the Arab forces. In February 1948, around 800 tribesmen had gathered near Aqaba so as to invade the Negev, but crossed to Egypt after Saudi rival King Abdallah officially denied them permission to pass through Jordanian territory. The Saudi troops were attached to the Egyptian command throughout the war, and estimates of their total strength ranged up to 1,200. By July 1948, the Saudis comprised three brigades within the Egyptian expeditionary force, and were stationed as guards between Gaza city and Rafah. This area came under heavy aerial bombardment during Operation Yoav in October, and faced a land assault beginning in late December which culminated in the Battle of Rafah in early January of the new year. With the subsequent armistice of 24 February 1949 and evacuation of almost 4,000 Arab soldiers and civilians from Gaza, the Saudi contingent withdrew through Arish and returned to Saudi Arabia.

During the first truce, Sudan sent six companies of regular troops to fight alongside the Egyptians. Yemen also committed a small expeditionary force to the war effort, and contingents from Morocco joined the Arab armies as well.

Course of the war
At the last moment, several Arab leaders, to avert catastrophe – secretly appealed to the British to hold on in Palestine for at least another year.

First phase: 15 May – 11 June 1948

On 14 May 1948, David Ben-Gurion declared the establishment of a Jewish state in Eretz-Israel to be known as the State of Israel, a few hours before the termination of the Mandate. At midnight on 15 May 1948, the British Mandate was officially terminated, and the State of Israel came into being. Several hours later, Iraq and the neighbouring Arab states, Egypt, Transjordan and Syria, invaded the newborn state, and immediately attacked Jewish settlements. What was now Israel had already, from 1 April down to 14 May, conducted 8 of its 13 full-scale military operations outside of the area allotted to a Jewish state by partition, and the operational commander Yigal Allon later stated that had it not been for the Arab invasion, Haganah's forces would have reached 'the natural borders of western Israel.' Although the Arab invasion was denounced by the United States, the Soviet Union, and UN secretary-general Trygve Lie, it found support from the Republic of China and other UN member states.

The initial Arab plans called for Syrian and Lebanese forces to invade from north while Jordanian and Iraqi forces were to invade from east in order to meet at Nazareth and then to push forward together to Haifa. In the south, the Egyptians were to advance and take Tel Aviv. At the Arab League meeting in Damascus on 11–13 May, Abdullah rejected the plan, which served Syrian interests, using the fact his allies were afraid to go to war without his army. He proposed that the Iraqis attack the Jezreel valley and the Arab Legion enter Ramallah and Nablus and link with the Egyptian army at Hebron, which was more in compliance with his political objective to occupy the territory allocated to the Arab State by the partition plan and promises not to invade the territory allocated to the Jewish State by the partition plan. In addition, Lebanon decided not to take part in the war at the last minute, due to the still-influential Christians' opposition and due to Jewish bribes.

Intelligence provided by the French consulate in Jerusalem on 12 May 1948 on the Arab armies' invading forces and their revised plan to invade the new state contributed to Israel's success in withstanding the Arab invasion.

The first mission of the Jewish forces was to hold on against the Arab armies and stop them, although the Arabs had enjoyed major advantages (the initiative, vastly superior firepower). As the British stopped blocking the incoming Jewish immigrants and arms supply, the Israeli forces grew steadily with large numbers of immigrants and weapons, that allowed the Haganah to transform itself from a paramilitary force into a real army. Initially, the fighting was handled mainly by the Haganah, along with the smaller Jewish militant groups Irgun and Lehi. On 26 May 1948, Israel established the Israel Defense Forces (IDF), incorporating these forces into one military under a central command.

Southern front – Negev

The Egyptian force, the largest among the Arab armies, invaded from the south.

On 15 May 1948, the Egyptians attacked two settlements: Nirim, using artillery, armoured cars carrying cannons, and Bren carriers; and Kfar Darom using artillery, tanks and aircraft. The Egyptians' attacks met fierce resistance from the few and lightly armed defenders of both settlements, and failed. On 19 May the Egyptians attacked Yad Mordechai, where an inferior force of 100 Israelis armed with nothing more than rifles, a medium machinegun and a PIAT anti-tank weapon, held up a column of 2,500 Egyptians, well-supported by armour, artillery and air units, for five days. The Egyptians took heavy losses, while the losses sustained by the defenders were comparatively light.

One of the Egyptian force's two main columns made its way northwards along the shoreline, through what is today the Gaza Strip and the other column advanced eastwards toward Beersheba. To secure their flanks, the Egyptians attacked and laid siege to a number of kibbutzim in the Negev, among those Kfar Darom, Nirim, Yad Mordechai, and Negba. The Israeli defenders held out fiercely for days against vastly superior forces, and managed to buy valuable time for the IDF's Givati Brigade to prepare to stop the Egyptian drive on Tel Aviv.

On 28 May the Egyptians renewed their northern advance, and stopped at a destroyed bridge north to Isdud. The Givati Brigade reported this advance but no fighters were sent to confront the Egyptians. Had the Egyptians wished to continue their advance northward, towards Tel Aviv, there would have been no Israeli force to block them.

From 29 May to 3 June, Israeli forces stopped the Egyptian drive north in Operation Pleshet. In the first combat mission performed by Israel's fledgling air force, four Avia S-199s attacked an Egyptian armoured column of 500 vehicles on its way to Isdud. The Israeli planes dropped 70 kilogram bombs and strafed the column, although their machine guns jammed quickly. Two of the planes crashed, killing a pilot. The attack caused the Egyptians to scatter, and they had lost the initiative by the time they had regrouped. Following the air attack, Israeli forces constantly bombarded Egyptian forces in Isdud with Napoleonchik cannons, and IDF patrols engaged in small-scale harassment of Egyptian lines. Following another air attack, the Givati Brigade launched a counterattack. Although the counterattack was repulsed, the Egyptian offensive was halted as Egypt changed its strategy from offensive to defensive, and the initiative shifted to Israel.

On 6 June, in the Battle of Nitzanim, Egyptian forces attacked the kibbutz of Nitzanim, located between Majdal (now Ashkelon) and Isdud, and the Israeli defenders surrendered after resisting for five days.

Battles of Latrun 

The heaviest fighting occurred in Jerusalem and on the Jerusalem – Tel Aviv road, between Jordan's Arab Legion and Israeli forces. As part of the redeployment to deal with the Egyptian advance, the Israelis abandoned the Latrun fortress overlooking the main highway to Jerusalem, which the Arab Legion immediately seized. The Arab Legion also occupied the Latrun Monastery. From these positions, the Jordanians were able to cut off supplies to Israeli fighters and civilians in Jerusalem.

The Israelis attempted to take the Latrun fortress in a series of battles lasting from 24 May to 18 July. The Arab Legion held Latrun and managed to repulse the attacks. During the attempts to take Latrun, Israeli forces suffered some 586 casualties, among them Mickey Marcus, Israel's first general, who was killed by friendly fire. The Arab Legion also took losses, losing 90 dead and some 200 wounded up to 29 May.

The besieged Israeli Jerusalem was only saved via the opening of the so-called "Burma Road", a makeshift bypass road built by Israeli forces that allowed Israeli supply convoys to pass into Jerusalem. Parts of the area where the road was built were cleared of Jordanian snipers in May and the road was completed on 14 June. Supplies had already begun passing through before the road was completed, with the first convoy passing through on the night of 1–2 June. The Jordanians spotted the activity and attempted to shell the road, but were ineffective, as it could not be seen. However, Jordanian sharpshooters killed several road workers, and an attack on 9 June left eight Israelis dead. On 18 July, elements of the Harel Brigade took about 10 villages to the south of Latrun to enlarge and secure the area of the Burma Road.

The Arab Legion was able to repel an Israeli attack on Latrun. The Jordanians launched two counterattacks, temporarily taking Beit Susin before being forced back, and capturing Gezer after a fierce battle, which was retaken by two Palmach squads the same evening.

Battle for Jerusalem

The Jordanians in Latrun cut off supplies to western Jerusalem. Though some supplies, mostly munitions, were airdropped into the city, the shortage of food, water, fuel and medicine was acute. The Israeli forces were seriously short of food, water and ammunition.

King Abdullah ordered Glubb Pasha, the commander of the Arab Legion, to enter Jerusalem on 17 May. The Arab Legion fired 10,000 artillery and mortar shells a day, and also attacked West Jerusalem with sniper fire.

Heavy house-to-house fighting occurred between 19 and 28 May, with the Arab Legion eventually succeeding in pushing Israeli forces from the Arab neighbourhoods of Jerusalem as well as the Jewish Quarter of the Old City. The 1,500 Jewish inhabitants of the Old City's Jewish Quarter were expelled, and several hundred were detained. The Jews had to be escorted out by the Arab Legion to protect them against Palestinian Arab mobs that intended to massacre them. On 22 May, Arab forces attacked kibbutz Ramat Rachel south of Jerusalem. After a fierce battle in which 31 Jordanians and 13 Israelis were killed, the defenders of Ramat Rachel withdrew, only to partially retake the kibbutz the following day. Fighting continued until 26 May, until the entire kibbutz was recaptured. Radar Hill was also taken from the Arab Legion, and held until 26 May, when the Jordanians retook it in a battle that left 19 Israelis and 2 Jordanians dead. A total of 23 attempts by the Harel Brigade to capture Radar Hill in the war failed.

The same day, Thomas C. Wasson, the US Consul-General in Jerusalem and a member of the UN Truce Commission was shot dead in West Jerusalem. It was disputed whether Wasson was killed by the Arabs or Israelis.

In mid to late October 1948, the Harel Brigade began its offensive in what was known as Operation Ha-Har, to secure the Jerusalem Corridor.

Northern Samaria

An Iraqi force consisting of two infantry and one armoured brigade crossed the Jordan River from northern Jordan, attacking the Israeli settlement of Gesher with little success. Following this defeat, Iraqi forces moved into the strategic triangle bounded by the Arab towns Nablus, Jenin and Tulkarm. On 25 May, they were making their way towards Netanya, when they were stopped. On 29 May, an Israeli attack against the Iraqis led to three days of heavy fighting over Jenin, but Iraqi forces managed to hold their positions. After these battles, the Iraqi forces became stationary and their involvement in the war effectively ended.

Iraqi forces failed in their attacks on Israeli settlements with the most notable battle taking place at Gesher, and instead took defensive positions around Jenin, Nablus, and Tulkarm, from where they could put pressure on the Israeli center. On 25 May, Iraqi forces advanced from Tulkarm, taking Geulim and reaching Kfar Yona and Ein Vered on the Tulkarm-Netanya road. The Alexandroni Brigade then stopped the Iraqi advance and retook Geulim. The IDF Carmeli and Golani Brigades attempted to capture Jenin during an offensive launched on 31 May, but were defeated in course of the subsequent battle by an Iraqi counterattack.

Northern front – Lake of Galilee

On 14 May Syria entered Palestine with the 1st Infantry Brigade supported by a battalion of armoured cars, a company of French R 35 and R 37 tanks, an artillery battalion and other units. The Syrian president, Shukri al-Quwwatli instructed his troops in the front, "to destroy the Zionists". "The situation was very grave. There aren't enough rifles. There are no heavy weapons," Ben-Gurion told the Israeli Cabinet. On 15 May, the Syrian forces turned to the eastern and southern Sea of Galilee shores, and attacked Samakh the neighbouring Tegart fort and the settlements of Sha'ar HaGolan, Ein Gev, but they were bogged down by resistance. Later, they attacked Samakh using tanks and aircraft, and on 18 May they succeeded in conquering Samakh and occupied the abandoned Sha'ar HaGolan.

On 21 May, the Syrian army was stopped at kibbutz Degania Alef in the north, where local militia reinforced by elements of the Carmeli Brigade halted Syrian armoured forces with Molotov cocktails, hand grenades and a single PIAT. One tank that was disabled by Molotov cocktails and hand grenades still remains at the kibbutz. The remaining Syrian forces were driven off the next day by four Napoleonchik mountain guns – Israel's first use of artillery during the war. Following the Syrian forces' defeat at the Deganias a few days later, they abandoned the Samakh village. The Syrians were forced to besiege the kibbutz rather than advance. One author claims that the main reason for the Syrian defeat was the Syrian soldiers' low regard for the Israelis who they believed would not stand and fight against the Arab army.

On 6 June, the 3rd battalion of the Lebanese Army took Al-Malkiyya and Qadas in what became the only intervention of the Lebanese army during the war, handing the towns over to the Arab Liberation Army and withdrawing on 8 July.

On 6 June, Syrian forces attacked Mishmar HaYarden, but they were repulsed. On 10 June, the Syrians overran Mishmar HaYarden and advanced to the main road, where they were stopped by units of the Oded Brigade. Subsequently, the Syrians reverted to a defensive posture, conducting only a few minor attacks on small, exposed Israeli settlements.

Palestinian forces 

In the continuity of the civil war between Jewish and Arab forces that had begun in 1947, battles between Israeli forces and Palestinian Arab militias took place, particularly in the Lydda, al-Ramla, Jerusalem, and Haifa areas. On 23 May, the Alexandroni Brigade captured Tantura, south of Haifa, from Arab forces. On 2 June, Holy War Army commander Hasan Salama was killed in a battle with Haganah at Ras al-Ein.

Air operations 

All Jewish aviation assets were placed under the control of the Sherut Avir (Air Service, known as the SA) in November 1947 and flying operations began in the following month from a small civil airport on the outskirts of Tel Aviv called Sde Dov, with the first ground support operation (in an RWD-13) taking place on 17 December. The Galilee Squadron was formed at Yavne'el in March 1948, and the Negev Squadron was formed at Nir-Am in April. By 10 May, when the SA suffered its first combat loss, there were three flying units, an air staff, maintenance facilities and logistics support. At the outbreak of the war on 15 May, the SA became the Israeli Air Force. With its fleet of light planes it was no match for Arab forces during the first few weeks of the war with their T-6s, Spitfires, C-47s, and Avro Ansons.

On 15 May, with the beginning of the war, four Royal Egyptian Air Force (REAF) Spitfires attacked Tel Aviv, bombing Sde Dov Airfield, where the bulk of Sherut Avir's aircraft were concentrated, as well as the Reading Power Station. Several aircraft were destroyed, some others were damaged, and five Israelis were killed. Throughout the following hours, additional waves of Egyptian aircraft bombed and strafed targets around Tel Aviv, although these raids had little effect. One Spitfire was shot down by anti-aircraft fire, and its pilot was taken prisoner. Throughout the next six days, the REAF would continue to attack Tel Aviv, causing civilian casualties. On 18 May, Egyptian warplanes attacked the Tel Aviv Central Bus Station, killing 42 people and wounding 100. In addition to their attacks on Tel Aviv, the Egyptians also bombed rural settlements and airfields, though few casualties were caused in these raids.

At the outset of the war, the REAF was able to attack Israel with near impunity, due to the lack of Israeli fighter aircraft to intercept them, and met only ground fire.

As more effective air defences were transferred to Tel Aviv, the Egyptians began taking significant aircraft losses. As a result of these losses, as well as the loss of five Spitfires downed by the British when the Egyptians mistakenly attacked RAF Ramat David, the Egyptian air attacks became less frequent. By the end of May 1948, almost the entire REAF Spitfire squadron based in El Arish had been lost, including many of its best pilots.

Although lacking fighter or bomber aircraft, in the first few days of the war, Israel's embryonic air force still attacked Arab targets, with light aircraft being utilised as makeshift bombers, striking Arab encampments and columns. The raids were mostly carried out at night to avoid interception by Arab fighter aircraft. These attacks usually had little effect, except on morale.

The balance of air power soon began to swing in favour of the Israeli Air Force following the arrival of 25 Avia S-199s from Czechoslovakia, the first of which arrived in Israel on 20 May. Ironically, Israel was using the Avia S-199, an inferior derivative of the Bf 109 designed in Nazi Germany to counter British-designed Spitfires flown by Egypt. Throughout the rest of the war, Israel would acquire more Avia fighters, as well as 62 Spitfires from Czechoslovakia. On 28 May 1948, Sherut Avir became the Israeli Air Force.

Many of the pilots who fought for the Israeli Air Force were foreign volunteers or mercenaries, including many World War II veterans.

On 3 June, Israel scored its first victory in aerial combat when Israeli pilot Modi Alon shot down a pair of Egyptian DC-3s that had just bombed Tel Aviv. Although Tel Aviv would see additional raids by fighter aircraft, there would be no more raids by bombers for the rest of the war. From then on, the Israeli Air Force began engaging the Arab air forces in air-to-air combat. The first dogfight took place on 8 June, when an Israeli fighter plane flown by Gideon Lichtman shot down an Egyptian Spitfire. By the fall of 1948, the IAF had achieved air superiority and had superior firepower and more knowledgeable personnel, many of whom had seen action in World War II. Israeli planes then began intercepting and engaging Arab aircraft on bombing missions.

Following Israeli air attacks on Egyptian and Iraqi columns, the Egyptians repeatedly bombed Ekron Airfield, where IAF fighters were based. During a 30 May raid, bombs aimed for Ekron hit central Rehovot, killing 7 civilians and wounding 30. In response to this, and probably to the Jordanian victories at Latrun, Israel began bombing targets in Arab cities. On the night of 31 May/1 June, the first Israeli raid on an Arab capital took place when three IAF planes flew to Amman and dropped several dozen 55 and 110-pound bombs, hitting the King's Palace and an adjacent British airfield. Some 12 people were killed and 30 wounded. During the attack, an RAF hangar was damaged, as were some British aircraft. The British threatened that in the event of another such attack, they would shoot down the attacking aircraft and bomb Israeli airfields, and as a result, Israeli aircraft did not attack Amman again for the rest of the war. Israel also bombed Arish, Gaza, Damascus, and Cairo. Israeli Boeing B-17 Flying Fortress bombers coming to Israel from Czechoslovakia bombed Egypt on their way to Israel. According to Alan Dershowitz, Israeli planes focused on bombing military targets in these attacks, though Benny Morris wrote that an 11 June air raid on Damascus was indiscriminate.

Sea battles 

At the outset of the war, the Israeli Navy consisted of three former Aliyah Bet ships that had been seized by the British and impounded in Haifa harbour, where they were tied up at the breakwater. Work on establishing a navy had begun shortly before Israeli independence, and the three ships were selected due to them having a military background – one, the INS Eilat, was an ex-US Coast Guard icebreaker, and the other two, the INS Haganah and INS Wedgwood, had been Royal Canadian Navy corvettes. The ships were put into minimum running condition by contractors dressed as stevedores and port personnel, who were able to work in the engine rooms and below deck. The work had to be clandestine to avoid arousing British suspicion. On 21 May 1948, the three ships set sail for Tel Aviv, and were made to look like ships that had been purchased by foreign owners for commercial use. In Tel Aviv, the ships were fitted with small field guns dating to the late 19th century and anti-aircraft guns. After the British left Haifa port on 30 June, Haifa became the main base of the Israeli Navy. In October 1948, a submarine chaser was purchased from the United States. The warships were manned by former merchant seamen, former crewmembers of Aliyah Bet ships, Israelis who had served in the Royal Navy during World War II, and foreign volunteers. The newly refurbished and crewed warships served on coastal patrol duties and bombarded Egyptian coastal installations in and around the Gaza area all the way to Port Said.

End of the first phase 

Throughout the following days, the Arabs were only able to make limited gains due to fierce Israeli resistance, and were quickly driven off their new holdings by Israeli counterattacks.

As the war progressed, the IDF managed to field more troops than the Arab forces. In July 1948, the IDF had 63,000 troops; by early spring 1949, they had 115,000. The Arab armies had an estimated 40,000 troops in July 1948, rising to 55,000 in October 1948, and slightly more by the spring of 1949.

Upon the implementation of the truce, the IDF had control over nine Arab cities and towns or mixed cities and towns: New Jerusalem, Jaffa, Haifa, Acre, Safed, Tiberias, Baysan (Beit She'an), Samakh and Yibna (Yavne). Another city, Jenin, was not occupied but its residents fled. The combined Arab forces captured 14 Jewish settlement points, but only one of them, Mishmar HaYarden, was in the territory of the proposed Jewish State according to Resolution 181. Within the boundaries of the proposed Jewish state, there were twelve Arab villages which opposed Jewish control or were captured by the invading Arab armies, and in addition to them, the Lod Airport and pumping station near Antipatris, which were within the boundaries of the proposed Jewish state, were under the control of the Arabs. The IDF captured about 50 large Arab villages outside of the boundaries of the proposed Jewish State and a larger number of hamlets and Bedouin encampments. 350 square kilometres of the proposed Jewish State were under the control of the Arab forces, while 700 square kilometres of the proposed Arab State were under the control of the IDF. This figure ignores the Negev desert which was not under any absolute control of either side.

In the period between the invasion and the first truce the Syrian army had 315 of its men killed and 400–500 injured; the Iraqi expeditionary force had 200 of its men killed and 500 injured; the Jordanian Arab Legion had 300 of its men killed and 400–500 (including irregulars and Palesinian volunteers fighting under the Jordanians); the Egyptian army had 600 of its men killed and 1,400 injured (including irregulars from the Muslim Brotherhood); the ALA, which returned to fight in early June, had 100 of its men killed or injured. 800 Jews were taken hostage by the Arabs and 1,300 Arabs were taken hostage by the Jews, mostly Palestinians.

First truce: 11 June – 8 July 1948
The UN declared a truce on 29 May, which came into effect on 11 June and lasted 28 days.
The truce was designed to last 28 days and an arms embargo was declared with the intention that neither side would make any gains from the truce. Neither side respected the truce; both found ways around the restrictions placed on them. Both the Israelis and the Arabs used this time to improve their positions, a direct violation of the terms of the ceasefire.

Reinforcements

At the time of the truce, the British view was that "the Jews are too weak in armament to achieve spectacular success". As the truce commenced, a British officer stationed in Haifa stated that the four-week-long truce "would certainly be exploited by the Jews to continue military training and reorganization while the Arabs would waste [them] feuding over the future divisions of the spoils". During the truce, the Israelis sought to bolster their forces by massive import of arms. The IDF was able to acquire weapons from Czechoslovakia as well as improve training of forces and reorganisation of the army during this time. Yitzhak Rabin, an IDF commander at the time of the war and later Israel's fifth Prime Minister, stated "[w]ithout the arms from Czechoslovakia... it is very doubtful whether we would have been able to conduct the war".

The Israeli army increased its manpower from approximately 30,000–35,000 men to almost 65,000 during the truce due to mobilisation and the constant immigration into Israel. It was also able to increase its arms supply to more than 25,000 rifles, 5,000 machine guns, and fifty million bullets. As well as violating the arms and personnel embargo, they also sent fresh units to the front lines, much as their Arab enemies did.

During the truce, Irgun attempted to bring in a private arms shipment aboard a ship called Altalena. Fearing a coup by the Irgun (at the time the IDF was in the process of integrating various pre-independence political factions), Ben-Gurion ordered that the arms be confiscated by force. After some miscommunication, the army was ordered by Ben-Gurion to sink the ship. Several Irgun members and IDF soldiers were killed in the fighting.

UN mediator Bernadotte

The ceasefire was overseen by UN mediator Folke Bernadotte and a team of UN Observers made up of army officers from Belgium, United States, Sweden and France.
Bernadotte was voted in by the General Assembly to "assure the safety of the holy places, to safeguard the well being of the population, and to promote 'a peaceful adjustment of the future situation of Palestine'". Folke Bernadotte reported:
 During the period of the truce, three violations occurred ... of such a serious nature:
 the attempt by ...the Irgun Zvai Leumi to bring war materials and immigrants, including men of military age, into Palestine aboard the ship Altalena on 21 June...
 Another truce violation occurred through the refusal of Egyptian forces to permit the passage of relief convoys to Jewish settlements in the Negeb...
 The third violation of the truce arose as a result of the failure of the Transjordan and Iraqi forces to permit the flow of water to Jerusalem.

After the truce was in place, Bernadotte began to address the issue of achieving a political settlement. The main obstacles in his opinion were "the Arab world's continued rejection of the existence of a Jewish state, whatever its borders; Israel's new 'philosophy', based on its increasing military strength, of ignoring the partition boundaries and conquering what additional territory it could; and the emerging Palestinian Arab refugee problem".

Taking all the issues into account, Bernadotte presented a new partition plan. He proposed there be a Palestinian Arab state alongside Israel and that a "Union" "be established between the two sovereign states of Israel and Jordan (which now included the West Bank); that the Negev, or part of it, be included in the Arab state and that Western Galilee, or part of it, be included in Israel; that the whole of Jerusalem be part of the Arab state, with the Jewish areas enjoying municipal autonomy and that Lydda Airport and Haifa be 'free ports' – presumably free of Israeli or Arab sovereignty". Israel rejected the proposal, in particular the aspect of losing control of Jerusalem, but they did agree to extend the truce for another month. The Arabs rejected both the extension of the truce and the proposal.

Second phase: 8–18 July 1948 ("Ten Day Battles")
On 8 July, the day before the expiration of the truce, Egyptian forces under General Muhammad Naguib renewed the war by attacking Negba. The following day, Israeli air forces launched a simultaneous offensive on all three fronts, ranging from Quneitra to Arish and the Egyptian air force bombed the city of Tel Aviv. During the fighting, the Israelis were able to open a lifeline to a number of besieged kibbutzim.

The fighting continued for ten days until the UN Security Council issued the Second Truce on 18 July. During those 10 days, the fighting was dominated by large-scale Israeli offensives and a defensive posture from the Arab side.

Southern front

In the south, the IDF carried out several offensives, including Operation An-Far and Operation Death to the Invader. The task of the 11th Brigades's 1st Battalion on the southern flank was to capture villages, and its operation ran smoothly, with but little resistance from local irregulars. According to Amnon Neumann, a Palmach veteran of the Southern front, hardly any Arab villages in the south fought back, due to the miserable poverty of their means and lack of weapons, and suffered expulsion. What slight resistance was offered was quelled by an artillery barrage, followed by the storming of the village, whose residents were expelled and houses destroyed.

On 12 July, the Egyptians launched an offensive action, and again attacked Negba, which they had previously failed to capture, using three infantry battalions, an armoured battalion, and an artillery regiment. In the battle that followed, the Egyptians were repulsed, suffering 200–300 casualties, while the Israelis lost 5 dead and 16 wounded.

After failing to take Negba, the Egyptians turned their attention to more isolated settlements and positions. On 14 July, an Egyptian attack on Gal On was driven off by a minefield and by resistance from Gal On's residents.

The Egyptians then assaulted the lightly defended village of Be'erot Yitzhak. The Egyptians managed to penetrate the village perimeter, but the defenders concentrated in an inner position in the village and fought off the Egyptian advance until IDF reinforcements arrived and drove out the attackers. The Egyptians suffered an estimated 200 casualties, while the Israelis had 17 dead and 15 wounded. The battle was one of Egypt's last offensive actions during the war, and the Egyptians did not attack any Israeli villages following this battle.

Lydda and al-Ramla

On 10 July, Glubb Pasha ordered the defending Arab Legion troops to "make arrangements...for a phony war". Israeli Operation Danny was the most important Israeli offensive, aimed at securing and enlarging the corridor between Jerusalem and Tel Aviv by capturing the roadside cities Lod (Lydda) and Ramle. In a second planned stage of the operation the fortified positions of Latrun – overlooking the Tel Aviv-Jerusalem highway – and the city of Ramallah were also to be captured. Hadita, near Latrun, was captured by the Israelis at a cost of 9 dead.

The objectives of Operation Danny were to capture territory east of Tel Aviv and then to push inland and relieve the Jewish population and forces in Jerusalem. Lydda had become an important military center in the region, lending support to Arab military activities elsewhere, and Ramle was one of the main obstacles blocking Jewish transportation. Lydda was defended by a local militia of around 1,000 residents, with an Arab Legion contingent of 125–300.

The IDF forces gathered to attack the city numbered around 8,000. It was the first operation where several brigades were involved. The city was attacked from the north via Majdal al-Sadiq and al-Muzayri'a, and from the east via Khulda, al-Qubab, Jimzu and Daniyal. Bombers were also used for the first time in the conflict to bombard the city. The IDF captured the city on 11 July.

Up to 450 Arabs and 9–10 Israeli soldiers were killed. The next day, Ramle fell. The civilian populations of Lydda and Ramle fled or were expelled to the Arab front lines, and following resistance in Lydda, the population there was expelled without provision of transport vehicles; some of the evictees died on the long walk under the hot July sun.

On 15–16 July, an attack on Latrun took place but did not manage to occupy the fort. A desperate second attempt occurred on 18 July by units from the Yiftach Brigade equipped with armoured vehicles, including two Cromwell tanks, but that attack also failed. Despite the second truce, which began on 18 July, the Israeli efforts to conquer Latrun continued until 20 July.

Jerusalem

Operation Kedem's aim was to secure the Old City of Jerusalem, but fewer resources were allocated. The operation failed. Originally the operation was to begin on 8 July, immediately after the first truce, by Irgun and Lehi forces. However, it was delayed by David Shaltiel, possibly because he did not trust their ability after their failure to capture Deir Yassin without Haganah assistance.

Irgun forces commanded by Yehuda Lapidot were to break through at the New Gate, Lehi was to break through the wall stretching from the New Gate to the Jaffa Gate, and the Beit Horon Battalion was to strike from Mount Zion.

The battle was planned to begin on the Shabbat, at 20:00 on 16 July, two days before the second ceasefire of the war. The plan went wrong from the beginning and was postponed first to 23:00 and then to midnight. It was not until 02:30 that the battle actually began. The Irgun managed to break through at the New Gate, but the other forces failed in their missions. At 05:45 on 17 July, Shaltiel ordered a retreat and to cease hostilities.

On 14 July 1948, Irgun occupied the Arab village of Malha after a fierce battle. Several hours later, the Arabs launched a counterattack, but Israeli reinforcements arrived, and the village was retaken at a cost of 17 dead.

Southern Galilee

The second plan was Operation Dekel, which was aimed at capturing the Lower Galilee including Nazareth. Nazareth was captured on 16 July, and by the time the second truce took effect at 19:00 18 July, the whole Lower Galilee from Haifa Bay to the Sea of Galilee was captured by Israel.

Eastern Galilee
Operation Brosh was launched in a failed attempt to dislodge Syrian forces from the Eastern Galilee and the Benot Yaakov Bridge. During the operation, 200 Syrians and 100 Israelis were killed.

Second truce: 18 July – 15 October 1948

At 19:00 on 18 July, the second truce of the conflict went into effect after intense diplomatic efforts by the UN.

On 16 September, Count Folke Bernadotte proposed a new partition for Palestine in which the Negev would be divided between Jordan and Egypt, and Jordan would annexe Lydda and Ramla. There would be a Jewish state in the whole of Galilee, with the frontier running from Faluja northeast towards Ramla and Lydda. Jerusalem would be internationalised, with municipal autonomy for the city's Jewish and Arab inhabitants, the Port of Haifa would be a free port, and Lydda Airport would be a free airport. All Palestinian refugees would be granted the right of return, and those who chose not to return would be compensated for lost property. The UN would control and regulate Jewish immigration.

The plan was once again rejected by both sides. On the next day, 17 September, Bernadotte was assassinated in Jerusalem by the militant Zionist group Lehi. A four-man team ambushed Bernadotte's motorcade in Jerusalem, killing him and a French UN observer sitting next to him. Lehi saw Bernadotte as a British and Arab puppet, and thus a serious threat to the emerging State of Israel, and feared that the provisional Israeli government would accept the plan, which it considered disastrous. Unbeknownst to Lehi, the government had already decided to reject it and resume combat in a month. Bernadotte's deputy, American Ralph Bunche, replaced him.

On 22 September 1948, the Provisional State Council of Israel passed the Area of Jurisdiction and Powers Ordnance, 5708–1948. The law officially added to Israel's size by annexing all land it had captured since the war began. It also declared that from then on, any part of Palestine captured by the Israeli army would automatically become part of Israel.

Little triangle pocket

The Arab villagers of the area known as the "Little Triangle" south of Haifa, repeatedly fired at Israeli traffic along the main road from Tel Aviv to Haifa and were supplied by the Iraqis from northern Samaria. The sniping at traffic continued during the Second Truce. The poorly planned assaults on 18 June and 8 July had failed to dislodge Arab militia from their superior positions. The Israelis launched Operation Shoter on 24 July in order to gain control of the main road to Haifa and to destroy all the enemy in the area. Israeli assaults on 24 and 25 July were beaten back by stiff resistance. The Israelis then broke the Arab defences with an infantry and armour assault backed by heavy artillery shelling and aerial bombing. Three Arab villages surrendered, and most of the inhabitants fled before and during the attack. The Israeli soldiers and aircraft struck at one of the Arab retreat routes, killing 60 Arab soldiers.. Most of the inhabitants fled before and during the attack, reaching northern Samaria; hundreds were forcibly expelled during the following days. At least a hundred militiamen and civilians were killed.

The Arabs claimed that the Israelis had massacred Arab civilians, but the Israelis rejected the claims. A United Nations investigation found no evidence of a massacre. Following the operation, the Tel Aviv-Haifa road was open to Israeli military and civilian traffic, and Arab roadblocks along the route were removed. Traffic along the Haifa-Hadera coastal railway was also restored.

Third phase: 15 October 1948 – 10 March 1949

Israel launched a series of military operations to drive out the Arab armies and secure the northern and southern borders of Israel.

Northern front – Galilee

On 22 October, the third truce went into effect. Irregular Arab forces refused to recognise the truce, and continued to harass Israeli forces and settlements in the north. On the same day that the truce came into effect, the Arab Liberation Army violated the truce by attacking Manara, capturing the strongpoint of Sheikh Abed, repulsing counterattacks by local Israeli units, and ambushed Israeli forces attempting to relieve Manara. The IDF's Carmeli Brigade lost 33 dead and 40 wounded. Manara and Misgav Am were totally cut off, and Israel's protests at the UN failed to change the situation.

On 24 October, the IDF launched Operation Hiram and captured the entire upper Galilee area, driving the ALA back to Lebanon, and ambushing and destroying an entire Syrian battalion. The Israeli force of four infantry brigades was commanded by Moshe Carmel. The entire operation lasted just 60 hours, during which numerous villages were captured, often after locals or Arab forces put up resistance. Arab losses were estimated at 400 dead and 550 taken prisoner, with low Israeli casualties.

Some prisoners were reportedly executed by the Israeli forces. An estimated 50,000 Palestinian refugees fled into Lebanon, some of them fleeing ahead of the advancing forces, and some expelled from villages which had resisted, while the Arab inhabitants of those villages which had remained at peace were allowed to remain and became Israeli citizens. The villagers of Iqrit and Birim were persuaded to leave their homes by Israeli authorities, who promised them that they would be allowed to return. Israel eventually decided not to allow them to return, and offered them financial compensation, which they refused to accept.

At the end of the month, the IDF had captured the whole of Galilee, driven all ALA forces out of Israel, and had advanced  into Lebanon to the Litani River, occupying thirteen Lebanese villages. In the village of Hula, two Israeli officers killed between 35 and 58 prisoners as retaliation for the Haifa Oil Refinery massacre. Both officers were later put on trial for their actions.

Negev

Israel launched a series of military operations to drive out the Arab armies and secure the borders of Israel. However, invading the West Bank might have brought into the borders of the expanding State of Israel a massive Arab population it could not absorb. The Negev desert was an empty space for expansion, so the main war effort shifted to Negev from early October. Israel decided to destroy or at least drive out the Egyptian expeditionary force since the Egyptian front lines were too vulnerable as permanent borders.

On 15 October, the IDF launched Operation Yoav in the northern Negev. Its goal was to drive a wedge between the Egyptian forces along the coast and the Beersheba-Hebron-Jerusalem road and ultimately to conquer the whole Negev. This was a special concern on the Israeli part because of a British diplomatic campaign to have the entire Negev handed over to Egypt and Jordan, and which thus made Ben-Gurion anxious to have Israeli forces in control of the Negev as soon as possible.

Operation Yoav was headed by the Southern Front commander Yigal Allon. Committed to Yoav were three infantry and one armoured brigades, who were given the task of breaking through the Egyptian lines. The Egyptian positions were badly weakened by the lack of a defence in depth, which meant that once the IDF had broken through the Egyptian lines, there was little to stop them. The operation was a huge success, shattering the Egyptian ranks and forcing the Egyptian Army from the northern Negev, Beersheba and Ashdod.

In the so-called "Faluja Pocket", an encircled Egyptian force was able to hold out for four months until the 1949 Armistice Agreements, when the village was peacefully transferred to Israel and the Egyptian troops left. Four warships of the Israeli Navy provided support by bombarding Egyptian shore installations in the Ashkelon area, and preventing the Egyptian Navy from evacuating retreating Egyptian troops by sea.

On 19 October, Operation Ha-Har commenced in the Jerusalem Corridor, while a naval battle also took place near Majdal (now Ashkelon), with three Israeli corvettes facing an Egyptian corvette with air support. An Israeli sailor was killed and four wounded, and two of the ships were damaged. One Egyptian plane was shot down, but the corvette escaped. Israeli naval vessels also shelled Majdal on 17 October, and Gaza on 21 October, with air support from the Israeli Air Force. The same day, the IDF captured Beersheba, and took 120 Egyptian soldiers prisoner. On 22 October, Israeli naval commandos using explosive boats sank the Egyptian flagship Emir Farouk, and damaged an Egyptian minesweeper.

On 9 November 1948, the IDF launched Operation Shmone to capture the Tegart fort in the village of Iraq Suwaydan. The fort's Egyptian defenders had previously repulsed eight attempts to take it, including two during Operation Yoav. Israeli forces bombarded the fort before an assault with artillery and airstrikes by B-17 bombers. After breaching the outlying fences without resistance, the Israelis blew a hole in the fort's outer wall, prompting the 180 Egyptian soldiers manning the fort to surrender without a fight. The defeat prompted the Egyptians to evacuate several nearby positions, including hills the IDF had failed to take by force. Meanwhile, IDF forces took Iraq Suwaydan itself after a fierce battle, losing 6 dead and 14 wounded.

From 5 to 7 December, the IDF conducted Operation Assaf to take control of the Western Negev. The main assaults were spearheaded by mechanised forces, while Golani Brigade infantry covered the rear. An Egyptian counterattack was repulsed. The Egyptians planned another counterattack, but it failed after Israeli aerial reconnaissance revealed Egyptian preparations, and the Israelis launched a preemptive strike. About 100 Egyptians were killed, and 5 tanks were destroyed, with the Israelis losing 5 killed and 30 wounded.

On 22 December, the IDF launched Operation Horev (also called Operation Ayin). The goal of the operation was to drive all remaining Egyptian forces from the Negev, destroying the Egyptian threat on Israel's southern communities and forcing the Egyptians into a ceasefire. During five days of fighting, the Israelis secured the Western Negev, expelling all Egyptian forces from the area.

Israeli forces subsequently launched raids into the Nitzana area, and entered the Sinai Peninsula on 28 December. The IDF captured Umm Katef and Abu Ageila, and advanced north towards Al Arish, with the goal of encircling the entire Egyptian expeditionary force. Israeli forces pulled out of the Sinai on 2 January 1949 following joint British-American pressure and a British threat of military action. IDF forces regrouped at the border with the Gaza Strip. Israeli forces attacked Rafah the following day, and after several days of fighting, Egyptian forces in the Gaza Strip were surrounded. The Egyptians agreed to negotiate a ceasefire on 7 January, and the IDF subsequently pulled out of Gaza. According to Morris, "the inequitable and unfair rules of engagement: the Arabs could launch offensives with impunity, but international interventions always hampered and restrained Israel's counterattacks."

On 28 December, the Alexandroni Brigade failed to take the Falluja Pocket, but managed to seize Iraq el-Manshiyeh and temporarily hold it. The Egyptians counterattacked, but were mistaken for a friendly force and allowed to advance, trapping a large number of men. The Israelis lost 87 soldiers.

On 5 March, Operation Uvda was launched following nearly a month of reconnaissance, with the goal of securing the Southern Negev from Jordan. The IDF entered and secured the territory, but did not meet significant resistance along the way, as the area was already designated to be part of the Jewish state in the UN Partition Plan, and the operation meant to establish Israeli sovereignty over the territory rather than actually conquer it. The Golani, Negev, and Alexandroni brigades participated in the operation, together with some smaller units and with naval support.

On 10 March, Israeli forces secured the Southern Negev, reaching the southern tip of Palestine: Umm Rashrash on the Red Sea (where Eilat was built later) and taking it without a battle. Israeli soldiers raised a hand-made Israeli flag ("The Ink Flag") at 16:00 on 10 March, claiming Umm Rashrash for Israel. The raising of the Ink Flag is considered to be the end of the war.

Anglo-Israeli air clashes

As the fighting progressed and Israel mounted an incursion into the Sinai, the Royal Air Force began conducting almost daily reconnaissance missions over Israel and the Sinai. RAF reconnaissance aircraft took off from Egyptian airbases and sometimes flew alongside Royal Egyptian Air Force planes. High-flying British aircraft frequently flew over Haifa and Ramat David Airbase, and became known to the Israelis as the "shuftykeit."

On 20 November 1948, an unarmed RAF photo-reconnaissance De Havilland Mosquito of No. 13 Squadron RAF was shot down by an Israeli Air Force P-51 Mustang flown by American volunteer Wayne Peake as it flew over the Galilee towards Hatzor Airbase. Peake opened fire with his cannons, causing a fire to break out in the port engine. The aircraft turned to sea and lowered its altitude, then exploded and crashed off Ashdod. The pilot and navigator were both killed.

Just before noon on 7 January 1949, four Spitfire FR18s from No. 208 Squadron RAF on a reconnaissance mission in the Deir al-Balah area flew over an Israeli convoy that had been attacked by five Egyptian Spitfires fifteen minutes earlier. The pilots had spotted smoking vehicles and were drawn to the scene out of curiosity. Two planes dived to below 500 feet altitude to take pictures of the convoy, while the remaining two covered them from 1,500 feet.

Israeli soldiers on the ground, alerted by the sound of the approaching Spitfires and fearing another Egyptian air attack, opened fire with machine guns. One Spitfire was shot down by a tank-mounted machine gun, while the other was lightly damaged and rapidly pulled up. The remaining three Spitfires were then attacked by patrolling IAF Spitfires flown by Chalmers Goodlin and John McElroy, volunteers from the United States and Canada respectively. All three Spitfires were shot down, and one pilot was killed.

Two pilots were captured by Israeli soldiers and taken to Tel Aviv for interrogation, and were later released. Another was rescued by Bedouins and handed over to the Egyptian Army, which turned him over to the RAF. Later that day, four RAF Spitfires from the same squadron escorted by seven Hawker Tempests from No. 213 Squadron RAF and eight from No. 6 Squadron RAF went searching for the lost planes, and were attacked by four IAF Spitfires. The Israeli formation was led by Ezer Weizman. The remaining three were manned by Weizman's wingman Alex Jacobs and American volunteers Bill Schroeder and Caesar Dangott. The Tempests found they could not jettison their external fuel tanks, and some had non-operational guns. Schroeder shot down a British Tempest, killing pilot David Tattersfield, and Weizman severely damaged a British plane flown by Douglas Liquorish. Weizman's plane and two other British aircraft also suffered light damage during the engagement. During the battle, British Tempest pilots treated British Spitfires as potential Israeli aircraft until the British Spitfire pilots were told by radio to wiggle their wings to be more clearly identifiable. The engagement ended when the Israelis realised the danger of their situation and disengaged, returning to Hatzor Airbase.

Israeli Prime Minister David Ben-Gurion personally ordered the wrecks of the RAF fighters that had been shot down to be dragged into Israeli territory. Israeli troops subsequently visited the crash sites, removed various parts, and buried the other aircraft. However, the Israelis did not manage to conceal the wrecks in time to prevent British reconnaissance planes from photographing them. An RAF salvage team was deployed to recover the wrecks, entering Israeli territory during their search. Two were discovered inside Egypt, while Tattersfield's Tempest was found north of Nirim,  inside Israel. Interviews with local Arabs confirmed that the Israelis had visited the crash sites to remove and bury the wrecks. Tattersfield was initially buried near the wreckage, but his body was later removed and reburied at the British War Cemetery in Ramla.

In response, the RAF readied all Tempests and Spitfires to attack any IAF aircraft they encountered and bomb IAF airfields. British troops in the Middle East were placed on high alert with all leave cancelled, and British citizens were advised to leave Israel. The Royal Navy was also placed on high alert. At Hatzor Airbase, the general consensus among the pilots, most of whom had flown with or alongside the RAF during World War II, was that the RAF would not allow the loss of five aircraft and two pilots to go without retaliation, and would probably attack the base at dawn the next day. That night, in anticipation of an impending British attack, some pilots decided not to offer any resistance and left the base, while others prepared their Spitfires and were strapped into the cockpits at dawn, preparing to repel a retaliatory airstrike. However, despite pressure from the squadrons involved in the incidents, British commanders refused to authorise any retaliatory strikes.

The day following the incident, British pilots were issued a directive to regard any Israeli aircraft infiltrating Egyptian or Jordanian airspace as hostile and to shoot them down, but were also ordered to avoid activity close to Israel's borders. Later in January 1949, the British managed to prevent the delivery of aviation spirit and other essential fuels to Israel in retaliation for the incident. The British Foreign Office presented the Israeli government with a demand for compensation over the loss of personnel and equipment.

UN Resolution 194
In December 1948, the UN General Assembly passed Resolution 194. It called to establish a UN Conciliation Commission to facilitate peace between Israel and Arab states. However, many of the resolution's articles were not fulfilled, since these were opposed by Israel, rejected by the Arab states, or were overshadowed by war as the 1948 conflict continued.

Weapons
Largely leftover World War II era weapons were used by both sides. Egypt had some British equipment; the Syrian army had some French. German, Czechoslovak and British equipment was used by Israel.

Aftermath

1949 Armistice Agreements

In 1949, Israel signed separate armistices with Egypt on 24 February, Lebanon on 23 March, Transjordan on 3 April, and Syria on 20 July. The Armistice Demarcation Lines, as set by the agreements, saw the territory under Israeli control encompassing approximately three-quarters of the prior British administered Mandate as it stood after Transjordan's independence in 1946. Israel controlled territories of about one-third more than was allocated to the Jewish State under the UN partition proposal.

The armistice lines were known afterwards as the "Green Line". The Gaza Strip and the West Bank (including East Jerusalem) were occupied by Egypt and Transjordan respectively. The United Nations Truce Supervision Organization and Mixed Armistice Commissions were set up to monitor ceasefires, supervise the armistice agreements, to prevent isolated incidents from escalating, and assist other UN peacekeeping operations in the region.

Just before the signing of the Israel-Transjordan armistice agreement, general Yigal Allon proposed a military offensive to conquer the West Bank up to the Jordan River as the natural, defensible border of the state. Ben-Gurion refused, although he was aware that the IDF was militarily strong enough to carry out the conquest. He feared the reaction of Western powers and wanted to maintain good relations with the United States and not to provoke the British. More, the results of the war were already satisfactory and Israeli leaders had to build a state.

Casualties

Israel lost 6,373 of its people, about 1% of its population at the time, in the war. About 4,000 were soldiers and the rest were civilians. Around 2,000 were Holocaust survivors.

The exact number of Arab casualties is unknown. One estimate places the Arab death toll at 7,000, including 3,000 Palestinians, 2,000 Egyptians, 1,000 Jordanians, and 1,000 Syrians. In 1958, Palestinian historian Aref al-Aref calculated that the Arab armies' combined losses amounted to 3,700, with Egypt losing 961 regular and 200 irregular soldiers and Transjordan losing 362 regulars and 200 irregulars. According to Henry Laurens, the Palestinians suffered double the Jewish losses, with 13,000 dead, 1,953 of whom are known to have died in combat situations. Of the remainder, 4,004 remain nameless but the place, tally and date of their death is known, and a further 7,043, for whom only the place of death is known, not their identities nor the date of their death. According to Laurens, the largest part of Palestinian casualties consisted of non-combatants and corresponds to the successful operations of the Israelis.

Demographic outcome in Palestine

During the 1947–1948 Civil War in Mandatory Palestine and the 1948 Arab–Israeli War that followed, around 750,000 Palestinian Arabs fled or were expelled from their homes, out of approximately 1,200,000 Arabs living in former British Mandate of Palestine, a displacement known to Palestinians as the Nakba. In 1951, the UN Conciliation Commission for Palestine estimated that the number of Palestinian refugees displaced from Israel was 711,000.

This number did not include displaced Palestinians inside Israeli-held territory. More than 400 Arab villages, and about ten Jewish villages and neighbourhoods, were depopulated during the Arab–Israeli conflict, most of them during 1948. According to estimate based on earlier census, the total Muslim population in Palestine was 1,143,336 in 1947. The causes of the 1948 Palestinian exodus are a controversial topic among historians. After the war, around 156,000 Arabs remained in Israel and became Israeli citizens.

Displaced Palestinian Arabs, known as Palestinian refugees, were settled in Palestinian refugee camps throughout the Arab world. The United Nations established UNRWA as a relief and human development agency tasked with providing humanitarian assistance to Palestinian refugees. Arab nations refused to absorb Palestinian refugees, instead keeping them in refugee camps while insisting that they be allowed to return.

Refugee status was also passed on to their descendants, who were also largely denied citizenship in Arab states, except in Transjordan. The Arab League instructed its members to deny Palestinians citizenship "to avoid dissolution of their identity and protect their right of return to their homeland." More than 1.4 million Palestinians still live in 58 recognised refugee camps, while more than 5 million Palestinians live outside Israel and the Palestinian territories.

Palestinian refugees and displaced persons and the lack of a Palestinian right of return remain major issues in the Arab–Israeli conflict.

Jewish immigration from Europe and the Arab world

In the three years from May 1948 to the end of 1951, 700,000 Jews settled in Israel, mainly along the borders and in former Arab lands, doubling the Jewish population there. Of these, upwards of 300,000 arrived from Asian and North African states. Among them, the largest group (over 100,000) was from Iraq. The remaining came mostly from Europe, including 136,000 from the 250,000 displaced Jews of World War II living in refugee camps and urban centers in Germany, Austria, and Italy, and more than 270,000 coming from Eastern Europe, mainly Romania and Poland (over 100,000 each). On the establishment of the state, a top priority was given to a policy for the "ingathering of exiles", and the Mossad LeAliyah Bet gave key assistance to the Jewish Agency to organise immigrants from Europe and the Middle East, and arrange for their transport to Israel. For Ben-Gurion, a fundamental defect of the State was that 'it lacked Jews'.

Jewish immigrants from Arab and Muslim countries left for numerous reasons. The war's outcome had exacerbated Arab hostilities to local Jewish communities. News of the victory aroused messianic expectations in Libya and Yemen; Zionism had taken root in many countries; active incentives for making aliyah formed a key part of Israeli policy; and better economic prospects and security were to be expected from a Jewish state. Some Arab governments, Egypt, for example, held their Jewish communities hostage at times. Persecution, political instability, and news of a number of violent pogroms also played a role. Some 800,000–1,000,000 Jews eventually left the Arab world over the next three decades as a result of these various factors. An estimated 650,000 of the departees settled in Israel.

Historiography

After the war, Israeli and Palestinian historiographies differed on the interpretation of the events of 1948: in the West the majority view was of a tiny group of vastly outnumbered and ill-equipped Jews fighting off the massed strength of the invading Arab armies; it was also widely believed that the Palestinian Arabs left their homes on the instruction of their leaders.

From 1980, with the opening of the Israeli and British archives, some Israeli historians have developed a different account of the period. In particular, the role played by Abdullah I of Jordan, the British government, the Arab aims during the war, the balance of force and the events related to the Palestinian exodus have been nuanced or given new interpretations. Some of them are still hotly debated among historians and commentators of the conflict today.

In popular culture 
A 2015 PBS documentary, A Wing and a Prayer, depicts the Al Schwimmer-led airborne smuggling missions to arm Israel.

The film Cast a Giant Shadow tells the story of an American colonel who was instrumental in the Israeli victory.

See also
 List of battles and operations in the 1948 Palestine war
 List of modern conflicts in the Middle East

Notes

References

Bibliography

Works by involved parties

 Dunkelman, Ben (1976) Dual Allegiance: An Autobiography. Macmillan Company of Canada, Toronto. 
 
 Kagan, Benjamin (1966) The Secret Battle for Israel. World Publishing,  Cleveland. 
 Lorch, Netanel (1961) The Edge of the Sword: Israel's War of Independence, 1947-1949. New York, London: G. P. Putnam's Sons

Secondary sources

 Adrian, Nathan (2004). Britain, Israel and Anglo-Jewry 1949–57. Routledge
 Aloni, Shlomo (2001). Arab-Israeli Air Wars 1947–82. Osprey Publishing. 
 Beckman, Morris (1999). The Jewish Brigade: An Army With Two Masters, 1944–45. Sarpedon Publishers. 
 
 Ben-Ami, Shlomo (2006). Scars of War, Wounds of Peace: The Israeli-Arab Tragedy. Oxford University Press. 
 Benvenisti, Meron (2002). Sacred Landscape. University of California Press. 
 Bercuson, David (1983). The Secret Army. Stein and Day, New York. 
 Bickerton, Ian and Hill, Maria (2003). Contested Spaces: The Arab-Israeli Conflict. McGraw-Hill. 
 Black, Ian (1992). Israel's Secret Wars: A History of Israel's Intelligence Services. Grove Press. 
 Bowyer Bell, John (1996). Terror Out of Zion: The Fight For Israeli Independence. Transaction Publishers. 
 Bregman, Ahron (2002). Israel's Wars: A History Since 1947. London: Routledge. 
 Cragg, Kenneth. Palestine. The Prize and Price of Zion. Cassel, 1997. 
 van Creveld, Martin (2004). Moshe Dayan. Weidenfeld & Nicolson. 
 Collins, Larry and Lapierre, Dominique (1973). O Jerusalem!", Pan Books. 
 El-Nawawy, Mohammed (2002), The Israeli-Egyptian Peace Process in the Reporting of Western Journalists, Ablex/Greenwood, 
 Flapan, Simha (1987), The Birth of Israel: Myths and Realities, Pantheon Books, New York.
 Geddes, Charles L. (1991). A Documentary History of the Arab-Israeli Conflict. Praeger. 
 Gelber, Yoav (1997). Jewish-Transjordanian Relations 1921–48: Alliance of Bars Sinister. London: Routledge. 
 Gelber, Yoav (2004). Israeli-Jordanian Dialogue, 1948–1953: Cooperation, Conspiracy, or Collusion?. Sussex Academic Press.
 Gelber, Yoav (2004) "Independence Versus Nakba"; Kinneret Zmora-Bitan Dvir Publishing, 
 Gelber, Yoav (2006). Palestine 1948. War, Escape and the Emergence of the Palestinian Refugee Problem. Sussex Academic Press. 
 Gershoni, Haim (1989). Israel: The Way it was. Associated University Presses.
 Gilbert, Martin (1998). Israel: A History . Black Swan. 
 Gilbert, Martin (1976). The Arab-Israeli Conflict: Its History in Maps Weidenfeld & Nicolson. 
 Gold, Dore (2007), The Fight for Jerusalem: Radical Islam, the West, and the Future of the Holy City, Regnery Publishing, 
 Israel Foreign Ministry, Foreign Ministry of the Russian Federation, Israel State Archives, Russian Federal Archives, Cummings Center for Russian Studies Tel Aviv University, Oriental Institute (2000). Documents on Israeli Soviet Relations, 1941–53. London: Routledge. 
 Kaniuk, Yoram (2001). Commander of the Exodus. Grove Press. 
 
 Fischbach, Michael R. 'Land'. In Philip Mattar (ed.) Encyclopedia of the Palestinians, Infobase Publishing. 2005. pp. 291–98
 Heller, Joseph. The Birth of Israel, 1945–1949: Ben-Gurion and His Critics, University Press of Florida, 2001
 Katz, Sam (1988). Israeli Units Since 1948. Osprey Publishing. 
 Khalaf, Issa Politics in Palestine: Arab Factionalism and Social Disintegration, 1939–1948. SUNY Press, 1991
 Khalidi, Rashid (2001). "The Palestinians and 1948: the underlying causes of failure." In Eugene Rogan and Avi Shlaim (eds.). The War for Palestine (pp. 12–36). Cambridge: Cambridge University Press. 
 Khalidi, Rashid (2006). The Iron Cage:The Story of the Palestinian Struggle for Statehood. Boston, MA:Beacon Press. 
 Khalidi, Walid (1987). From Haven to Conquest: Readings in Zionism and the Palestine Problem Until 1948. Institute for Palestine Studies. 
 Khalidi, Walid (ed.) (1992). All that remains. Institute for Palestine Studies. 
 Krämer, Gudrun, A History of Palestine: From the Ottoman Conquest to the Founding of the State of Israel, Princeton UP 2011.
 Krammer, Arnold. (1974). The Forgotten Friendship: Israel and the Soviet Bloc 1947-53. University of Illinois Press, Urbana. 
 
 Landis, Joshua. "Syria and the Palestine War: fighting King 'Abdullah's 'Greater Syria plan.'" Rogan and Shlaim. The War for Palestine. 178–205.
 Levenberg, Haim (1993). Military Preparations of the Arab Community in Palestine: 1945–1948. London: Routledge. 
 Levin, Harry. Jerusalem Embattled – A Diary of the City under Siege. Cassels, 1997. 
 Lockman, Zachary. Comrades and Enemies: Arab and Jewish Workers in Palestine, 1906–1948. University of California Press, 1996
 Makdisi Saree, Palestine Inside Out: An Everyday Occupation, W.W. Norton & Company 2010
 Masalha, Nur (1992). Expulsion of the Palestinians: The Concept of 'Transfer' in Zionist Political Thought, 1882–1948, Institute for Palestine Studies, 
 Morris, Benny (1988), The Birth of the Palestinian Refugee Problem, 1947–1949, Cambridge Middle East Library
 Morris, Benny (1994), 1948 and after; Israel and the Palestinians Morris, Benny (2001). Righteous Victims: A History of the Zionist-Arab Conflict, 1881–2001. Vintage Books. 
 Morris, Benny (2004), The Birth of the Palestinian Refugee Problem Revisited, Cambridge University Press, Cambridge UK, 
 Morris, Benny (2008), 1948: The First Arab-Israeli War, Yale University Press, New Haven, 
 Oring, Elliott (1981). Israeli Humor – The Content: The Content and Structure of the Chizbat of the Palmah. SUNY Press. 
 Pappe, Ilan (2006), The Ethnic Cleansing of Palestine, Oneworld Publications, Oxford, England, 
 
 Reiter, Yitzhak, "National Minority, Regional Majority: Palestinian Arabs Versus Jews in Israel" (Syracuse Studies on Peace and Conflict Resolution), (2009) Syracuse Univ Press (Sd). 
 Rogan, Eugene L. and Avi Shlaim, eds. The War for Palestine: Rewriting the History of 1948. Cambridge: Cambridge UP, 2001
 Rogan, Eugene L. and Avi Shlaim, eds. The War for Palestine: Rewriting the History of 1948. 2nd edition. Cambridge: Cambridge UP, 2007
 Rogan, Eugene L. "Jordan and 1948: the persistence of an official history." Rogan and Shlaim. The War for Palestine. pp. 104–24
 Sadeh, Eligar (1997). Militarization and State Power in the Arab-Israeli Conflict: Case Study of Israel, 1948–1982. Universal Publishers. 
 Sachar, Howard M. (1979). A History of Israel, New York: Knopf. 
 Sayigh, Yezid (2000). Armed Struggle and the Search for State: The Palestinian National Movement, 1949–1993. Oxford: Oxford University Press. 
 Sela, Avraham. "Abdallah Ibn Hussein." The Continuum Political Encyclopedia of the Middle East. Ed. Avraham Sela. New York: Continuum, 2002. pp. 13–14.
 Shapira, Anita (1992). Land and Power: Zionist Resort to Force, 1881–1948. Oxford University Press. 
 Sheleg, Yair (2001). "A Short History of Terror" Haaretz.
 Shlaim, Avi (2001). "Israel and the Arab Coalition." In Eugene Rogan and Avi Shlaim (eds.). The War for Palestine (pp. 79–103). Cambridge: Cambridge University Press. 
 Slater, Leonard (1970). The Pledge. Simon and Schuster, Mew York. 
 Stearns, Peter N. Citation from The Encyclopedia of World History Sixth Edition, Peter N. Stearns (general editor), 2001 Houghton Mifflin Company, at Bartleby.com.
 Tripp, Charles. "Iraq and the 1948 War: mirror of Iraq's disorder." in Rogan and Shlaim. The War for Palestine. pp. 125–50.
 Zertal, Idith (2005). Israel's Holocaust and the Politics of Nationhood. Cambridge: Cambridge University Press. 

Ancillary works

 Brown, Judith M. and Louis, Wm. Roger (1999). The Oxford History of the British Empire. Oxford: Oxford University Press. 
 Flint, Colin. Introduction to Geopolitics, Routledge 2012
 Karsh, Inari & Karsh, Efraim (1999). Empires of the Sand: The Struggle for Mastery in the Middle East, 1789–1923. Harvard University Press. 
 Penkower, Monty Noam (2002). Decision on Palestine Deferred: America, Britain and Wartime Diplomacy, 1939–1945. London: Routledge. 
 Oren, Michael, Six Days of War, Random House Ballantine Publishing Group, New York 2003, 
 Richelson, Jeffrey T. (1997). A Century of Spies: Intelligence in the Twentieth Century. Oxford: Oxford University Press. 
 Sicker, Martin (1999). Reshaping Palestine: From Muhammad Ali to the British Mandate, 1831–1922. Praeger/Greenwood. 

Further reading

Fiction
 The Hope by Herman Wouk, a historical novel that includes a fictionalised version of Israel's War of Independence.
 Leon Uris, Exodus'', another historical novel

External links

 One of last surviving founders of IAF recalls mission that stopped Egypt from advancing on Tel Aviv.
 Pictorial History: Air Force Volunteers.
 
 
 About the War of Independence
 United Nations: System on the Question of Palestine 
 Summary of Arab-Israeli wars
 History of Palestine, Israel and the Israeli-Palestinian Conflict
 
 The BBC on the UN Partition Plan
 The BBC on the Formation of Israel
 Israeli War of Independence: an autobiographical account by a South African participant
 Israel and the Arab Coalition in 1948
 
 

 
1948 in Israel
1948 in Egypt
Arab Israeli War
Battles and operations of the 1948 Arab–Israeli War
Wars of independence
1948 Palestinian exodus
Invasions of Israel